Best of Berlin 1979–1988 is a compilation album by the American new wave band Berlin, released in 1988.

Track listing

References

Berlin (band) albums
1988 greatest hits albums
Geffen Records compilation albums